Lac La Croix Water Aerodrome  is located on Lac La Croix, Ontario, Canada.

References

Registered aerodromes in Rainy River District
Seaplane bases in Ontario